The Regional State Administrative Agency for Eastern Finland is one of the six Regional State Administrative Agencies. Its administrative area consists of three regions, 14 districts and 65 municipalities.

Regions

References 

Regional State Administrative Agency